Zhang Xiao may refer to:

Zhang Xiao (photographer) (born 1981), Chinese photographer
Zhang Xiao (footballer) (born 1988), Chinese footballer

See also
Zhang Xiaoling (born 1957), Chinese para table tennis player